Music from Two Continents (Live at Jazz Jamboree '84) is a live album by pianist Cecil Taylor on which he is joined by a large ensemble. It was recorded on October 26, 1984, at the Jazz Jamboree festival in Warsaw, Poland, and was released in 2021 by the Polish label Fundacja Słuchaj!. The album was recorded several days after the Milan studio sessions documented on Winged Serpent (Sliding Quadrants), and features most of the same musicians.

Reception
The New York City Jazz Record'''s Duck Baker called the album "excellent," and wrote: "There are fantastic solos, duos and other combinations along the way, but even when everyone is blowing their heads off, it is always, unmistakably, the music of Cecil Taylor."

In an article for JazzWord, Ken Waxman described the album as "another exhilarating musical ride from Taylor and one many will which to climb aboard," and noted: "Containing languorous and muted passages as well as expected frenetic and clamorous ones, the effect is that of multiple distinct timbres proposed at the same time, with internal logic preventing babbling turbulence."

Stuart Broomer of The Whole Note stated: "Like many of Taylor's works, this hour-long piece had a ritualistic character, incorporating chanting and shouting. Here, movements with cries, hollers and snippets of song, hinting at mysteries and suggesting primordial rites, alternate with longer instrumental passages of motivically organized improvisation. These segments touch on Taylor's deep roots."

Writing for the Downtown Music Gallery'', Bruce Lee Gallanter commented: "There is some magic glue going on here: the Taylor-led rhythm team is burnin' at the center of the storm while the eight reeds & brass swirl together into an intense, spirited frenzy! Each member of the reeds & brass choir get a chance to stretch out, soar together and add inspired solos. The music here is well-recorded and the entire 60 minute performance is extraordinary from the beginning to the righteous conclusion. It doesn't get any better than this!"

Track listing
Composed by Cecil Taylor.

 "Music from Two Continents" – 1:02:15

Personnel 
 Cecil Taylor – piano
 Jimmy Lyons – alto saxophone
 Frank Wright Jr. – tenor saxophone
 John Tchicai – tenor saxophone
 Gunter Hampel – bass clarinet, vibraphone
 Karen Lyons – bassoon
 Tomasz Stańko – trumpet
 Enrico Rava – trumpet
 Conrad Bauer – trombone
 William Parker – double bass
 Henry Martinez – drums

References

2021 live albums
Cecil Taylor live albums
Fundacja Słuchaj! live albums